Philip Hillier Fussell (born 12 February 1931) played first-class cricket for Somerset in two matches, one in each of the 1953 and 1956 seasons. He was born at Rode, Somerset.

A member of the Fussell family which had farming, and brewing interests in and around the village of Rode, Philip Fussell was all-round sportsman who, in addition to cricket, was prominent also in shooting, where he was a champion at clay pigeon shooting, and salmon fishing. He is named in an article published in The Field in 2009 on the 100 "best shots" of all time. It said: "Clay and game are one and the same for this experienced and beautifully consistent shot, though pigeon is his speciality." In The Field his first name is spelled as "Phillip".

As a cricketer, Fussell played for Lansdown and Frome cricket clubs as a right-handed batsman and right-arm medium-paced bowler. He did not make much impact in his two first-class matches, totalling just 10 runs in all and taking just a single wicket.

References

1931 births
Living people
English cricketers
Somerset cricketers